The towns and cities of the Hudson Valley were created by the U.S. state of New York as municipalities, in order to perform the services of local government. In 1683, prior to the creation of modern towns, the Province of New York was divided into twelve counties for administrative purposes by the Colonial Governor of New York. In the Hudson Valley, these divisions included Dutchess, Orange, and Ulster counties. Dutchess and Orange remained unorganized until 1713, with Dutchess administered from Ulster; Orange would be administered from New York County. Future counties would be formed and towns exchanged over time, with Rockland County split from Orange in 1799, at which time the southern towns of Ulster were transferred to Orange as compensation for the loss; and Putnam County from Dutchess in 1812, these county's towns can trace their origins to towns and precincts that were formed in their parent counties. Another change that occurred was the transfer of Dutchess County's northern section, the Livingston Manor, to Columbia County. Greene County was formed in 1800 by the combination of the southernmost towns of Albany County with the northernmost towns of Ulster. The history of the towns of Greene and Columbia counties can be found at the Timeline of town creation in New York's Capital District.

New York experimented with different types of municipalities before settling upon the current format of towns and cities occupying all the land in a county, and all previous forms were transformed into towns (or divided into multiple towns) in 1788 when all of the state of New York was divided into towns. Some early forms of government in earlier years included land patents with some municipal rights, districts, precincts, and boroughs. Though originally intended to be mere "…involuntary subdivisions of the state, constituted for the purpose of the more convenient exercise of governmental functions by the state for the benefit of all its citizens" as defined by the courts in 1916 (Short v. Town of Orange), towns gained home rule powers from the state in 1964, at which time towns became "a municipal corporation comprising the inhabitants within its boundaries, and formed with the purpose of exercising such powers and discharging such duties of local government and administration of public affairs as have been, or, maybe [sic] conferred or imposed upon it by law."

The following is a timeline showing the creation of the current towns from their predecessors stretching back to the earliest municipal entity over the area. The timelines only represent which town(s) a particular town was created from and do not represent annexations of territory to and from towns that already existed. All municipalities are towns unless otherwise noted as patent, township, borough, district, or city.

Dutchess County

Notes
Dutchess County was one of the twelve original counties formed in 1683 in the Province of New York; but was under the governance of Ulster County until a county government was erected in 1713 at which point it received separate representation in the General Assembly.  In 1737 Dutchess was divided into seven precincts, six of which descended into the present towns of Dutchess County while the seventh became the progenitor of the towns of Putnam County.

Putnam County

Notes

Ulster County

Notes

Wiltwyck and Esopus were a dependency of the Village of Beverwyck (Court of Fort Orange and Beverwyck) prior to 1661.
Dash lines are used for leading to the town of Olive from its antecendants only help in tracking those lines, which due to space constraints cross other town's lines. No significance should be interpreted with the use of dash lines leading to the town of Olive.

Orange County

Notes

In 1863 the Orange County Board of Supervisors erected two new towns from part of Monroe, named Highlands and Southfield. This was declared overruled by the state legislature in 1865 and therefore those towns are not shown here.
In 2019, part of Monroe became the Town of Palm Tree pursuant to a 2017 referendum. (The above diagram has not yet been updated to include this development.)

Rockland County

Notes

See also

Timeline of town creation in Downstate New York
Timeline of town creation in New York's Capital District
Timeline of town creation in Central New York

Citations

References
 

Hudson Valley
Former municipalities in New York (state)
 
 
History of New York (state)